Marie Anne or Marie-Anne is the name of:

Aristocrats
Princess Marie Anne of France (1664-1664?), daughter of King Louis XIV of France
Infanta Marie Anne of Portugal (1861-1942), Portuguese infanta and Grand Duchess consort of Luxembourg
Marie Anne de Bourbon (disambiguation)
Marie Anne de La Trémoille, princesse des Ursins (1642-1722), an influential lady in the Spanish royal court during Philip V's early reign
Marie Anne de Mailly (1717-1744), duchesse de Châteauroux and mistress of King Louis XV of France
Marie Anne Mancini (1649-1714), duchesse de Bouillon and niece of Cardinal Mazarin

Other
Marie-Anne Asselin (1888-1971), French-Canadian opera singer and voice teacher
Marie-Anne de Bovet (born 1855), French writer
Marie-Anne Charlotte de Corday d'Armont, better known as Charlotte Corday (1768–1793), assassin of Jean-Paul Marat
Marie Anne de Cupis de Camargo (1710-1770), French/Belgian dancer
Marie-Anne Gaboury (1780-1875), first woman of European descent to settle in what is now western Canada, grandmother of Louis Riel
Marie-Anne Leroudier (1838-1908), French embroiderer
Marie-Anne Montchamp (born 1957), Secretary of State for Solidarities and Social Cohesion in the French government
Marie-Anne Pierrette Paulze (1758-1836), French chemist and wife of Antoine Lavoisier
Marie-Anne de Roumier-Robert, eighteenth century writer, author of one of the earliest works of science fiction

See also
Maria Anna of Spain (1606-1646), Infanta of Spain, Holy Roman Empress, and Queen of Hungary and Bohemia
Mariana (name), another given name
Anne-Marie (given name)

Compound given names